The Great God Pan (cast 1898–1899) is a bronze sculpture by American sculptor George Grey Barnard. Since 1907, it has been a fixture of the Columbia University campus in Manhattan, New York City.

Description

The sculpture depicts the Greek god Pan, a half-man, half-goat deity associated with pastoral living, rustic music, and carnality. Barnard's Pan is mature and strongly muscled, with a long tangled beard, the ears and cloven hooves of a goat, but no horns or tail. He reclines lazily on his side atop a rock, playing his reed pipe and dangling one hoof over the edge of the rock.
 
It weighs .
 
The inscription on the back reads: "George Grey Barnard – Sculptor". The inscription on the right front corner reads: "Geo. Gray Barnard / Sc. 1899. Cast in one piece by / Henry-Bonnard Bronze Company / Founders New York 1899," and is accompanied by the founder's mark.

History
Barnard conceived the sculpture in 1894. Originally it was intended to be a fountain sculpture for the courtyard of The Dakota, a luxury apartment building on Manhattan's Upper West Side. Alfred Corning Clark, an heir to the Singer Sewing Machine fortune, was Barnard's most important early patron. Clark's father had built The Dakota, and bequeathed the building to Clark's teenage son Edward in 1882. Clark visited Paris in 1895 and commissioned Barnard to proceed with the larger-than-life-size sculpture, but it was never installed at The Dakota. 

Alfred Corning Clark died unexpectedly at age 51 in April 1896. His family privately offered Pan to the city in November 1896, to be the centerpiece of a fountain in Central Park:
The "Pan," which was sketched in Paris, but executed in this country, the plaster cast forming part of the exhibit at Logerot Gardens, was ordered by Mr. Clark for the court of the Dakota flats; but convinced that this superb work of art should belong to the public, he directed his heirs to present it to the city, on the condition that it be placed in Central Park, the Clark estate paying all expenses of casting and erection.
The city's Art Commission approved acceptance of the gift, but the city's Parks Commission spent six months debating the suitability of the work and considering various Central Park locations before declining the Clark family's offer. The New York Evening Telegram published a June 10, 1897, cartoon entitled "The Two Orphans", which lampooned Barnard's Pan and Frederick William MacMonnies's Bacchante and Infant Faun, the latter having been rejected for the Boston Public Library the year before. 

Edward Severin Clark, continuing his late father's support for Barnard's work, funded the casting of Pan in bronze and loaned the bronze cast to the Metropolitan Museum of Art and international expositions.

Bronze casting

Barnard wanted his plaster sculpture cast in bronze in a single piece—as opposed to assembled from separately-cast pieces—but could not find a French foundry willing to attempt it. French-born Eugene F. Aucaigne, manager of the Henry-Bonnard Bronze Company of Mount Vernon, New York, took on the challenge. Following months of preparation and construction of an extremely complex and heavy mold, Aucaigne oversaw the successful casting of Pan in bronze in August 1898. It was the largest bronze sculpture cast in a single piece in the United States at that time. 

Barnard's plaster model for the sculpture's base featured a rock surrounded by reeds and cattails, with a standing crane to visually balance Pan's head. He also modeled Laughing Faun, a small mask to cover the water spouts around the sculpture's base. The idea of Pan as a fountain sculpture was abandoned following the Parks Commission's rejection; Barnard's base was never cast in bronze, and the faun masks were not used.

Barnard tried to manipulate the Parks Commission into reconsidering its rejection of Pan, presenting the sculpture's placement in Central Park as a fait accompli in a national magazine. When the commission balked at this, a boulder fronting on Central Park Lake was proposed as an alternative site. The commission dithered for four more years, before again rejecting Pan for Central Park.

Exhibitions
Barnard included the plaster cast of Pan in his first one-man exhibition, held in November 1898 under the glass roof of the Logerot Hotel winter garden, at Fifth Avenue and 18th Street in New York City.

The bronze Pan was loaned for a year to the Metropolitan Museum of Art, beginning in spring 1899. 

Barnard exhibited Pan and Struggle of the Two Natures in Man at the Exposition Universelle in Paris from April to November 1900. The bronze Pan was installed outdoors along the Champs-Élysées, and the marble Two Natures inside the Petit Palais des Beaux-Arts. He was awarded a Gold Medal for the two sculptures.

Barnard exhibited Pan and Two Natures at the Pan-American Exposition in Buffalo, New York, from May to November 1901. The bronze Pan was installed in front of the art gallery and the marble Two Natures within the gallery. He was awarded a Gold Medal for the two sculptures. 

In November 1902, the bronze Pan was among the four works shown by Barnard at the National Sculpture Society exhibition at Madison Square Garden, New York City. 

The bronze Pan was exhibited at the 1904 World's Fair in St. Louis, Missouri, as part of an industrial display inside the Palace of Manufactures. The Henry-Bonnard Bronze Company was awarded a Gold Medal for its accomplishment in casting the sculpture, but Barnard was not recognized for Pan artistic merit.

The plaster cast of Pan was included in the Museum of Fine Arts, Boston's one-man exhibition of Barnard's work, November–December 1908.

Columbia University

Following the second rejection of Pan for Central Park, Edward Clark and his mother donated the bronze sculpture to Columbia College (now Columbia University). The sculpture was placed upon a green-granite Neoclassical base with three bronze lion-head water spouts for use as a fountain. Charles Follen McKim, of McKim, Meade & White, designed the architectural setting for Pan: a "D"-shaped granite fountain basin, circular pool, stepped platform, and exedra (curved stone bench). The Pan Fountain was installed in 1907 on The Green at Amsterdam Avenue and 120th Street, then the northeast corner of the campus.

The sculpture inspired a poem by Ralph Perry, editor of the 1916 yearbook, The Columbian:
To the Great God Pan

In 1959, to make way for construction of the Seeley W. Mudd Engineering Building, Columbia relocated the Pan statue and its granite base—but not its architectural setting and fountain—to Amsterdam Avenue and 119th Street. It was relocated again in 1963, to a courtyard between Fayerweather and Avery Halls. To make way for a 1975 expansion of Avery Hall, Pan was relocated to its current site: north of West 116th Street, between Lewisohn Hall and the Low Memorial Library.

Critical reception
In 1903, Lorado Taft wrote:

Having come home [following 12 years in Paris] with the avowed object of assisting in the development of a "national art," Mr. Barnard must have been rather bewildered to find himself promptly engaged upon a large statue of the "Great God Pan," intended to surmount a rustic fountain within the court of an apartment building. It never reached its destination, but was called higher, to the adornment of Central Park. In common with each of Mr. Barnard's works in turn, it has been pronounced "one of the strangest and most original things yet done by an American sculptor." Its whimsical novelty is as marked as the skill of its execution,—an execution no less cleverly adapted to bronze than most of Mr. Barnard's sculpture to stone. One wonders how he ever happened to make this monstrous creature. What inspiration could the sculptor of the "Two Natures" find in such a subject? Probably some moss-stained figure of classic Italy gave him the idea, and he overlooked its anachronism in his love of muscular modelling, and of nature in general, which Pan may still be permitted to typify. The subject is not very interesting, however; the head is too powerfully grotesque, and the misshapen legs are unpleasant. The transition of the latter from the human to the brutish form should have been made more plausible. Frémiet, with far less felicity of surface handling, could have made those legs convincing. The venerable master would have made us feel sure that if ever there had been such monstrosities, they must have been just as he saw fit to fashion them.

In 1908, J. Nilsen Laurvik wrote:
In the sculpture of Barnard, as in the work of Rodin, we see the vital, almost consuming energy that appears to bestir itself within the clay or marble as it flows out in the undulating, rhythmic movements of thews [sinews] and muscles, in the suggestions of the delicate yet withal powerful bony structure of the body under its finely drawn covering of soft flesh and smooth envelope of skin, as in the prostrate figure of the Two Natures, where the shoulder blades and the delicate ridge and furrow of the backbone are modeled with a supple, caressing, quivering touch as of life itself. This is no less true of his well-known bronze figure Pan, which adorns the northeastern corner of Columbia University campus. With the discerning, this lazy creature of infinite good nature has already become a sort of a classic in the art of our country—one of the very few so far, and one destined to remain incomparable for some time to come. In its suavity and suppleness of modeling it reveals Barnard's virtuosity in a striking manner. It has all the freedom and spontaneity of what we are pleased to term a "sketch" with the dignity and impressiveness of what we so often mistake for a "finished" composition. The modeling of the mobile features of the old god's luxuriant face, executed in eight final sweeps of the sculptor's two thumbs, is in itself a tour de force indicative of the man's perfect mastery of his medium. To say that he thinks and feels in clay would hardly be an exaggeration.

See also
 Greek mythology in western art and literature

Notes

References

External links
 

1907 establishments in New York City
1899 sculptures
Bronze sculptures in Manhattan
Columbia University campus
Ancient Greece in art and culture
Musical instruments in art
Nude sculptures in New York (state)
Outdoor sculptures in Manhattan
Relocated buildings and structures in New York City
Sculptures by George Grey Barnard
Sculptures of Pan (god)
Statues in New York City